The Ethiopian Social Democratic Party (ESDP) is a political party in Ethiopia.  the leaders of the ESDP are chairman Dr. Beyene Petros, vice chairman Mulu Meja, and secretary Alema Koira.

During the 2005 elections, 15 May 2005, the party was part of the United Ethiopian Democratic Forces, which won 52 out of 527 seats in the Council of People's Representatives.

Dr. Beyene Petros announced in February 2006 that the party would change its name from Ethiopian Social Democratic Federal Party to the Ethiopian Social Democratic Party, emphasizing its connections with the European Social Democratic movement.

References

External links
ESDFP Says will Hold discussion with EPRDF

Political parties in Ethiopia
Social democratic parties in Africa
Socialist parties in Ethiopia